Beggar on Horseback is a 1925 American silent comedy film based upon the 1924 play written by Marc Connelly and George S. Kaufman. It was adapted for the screen by Walter Woods and directed by James Cruze. It stars Edward Everett Horton, Esther Ralston, Erwin Connelly, Gertrude Short, Ethel Wales, Theodore Kosloff, and Betty Compson. It was released on August 24, 1925, by Paramount Pictures.

Plot
As described in a film magazine review, a young idealistic jazz composer is on the verge of a nervous breakdown, and feels that he cannot continue a relationship with a sympathetic young woman because of a lack of funds. He is considering marrying a rich young woman who worships jazz, and falls asleep and dreams a horrible nightmare of his life as her husband. In this fantasy dream, he kills those who oppress him. He awakens and comes to appreciate the sympathetic young woman and seeks happiness with her. His publishers award him with royalties for his music compositions.

Cast

Preservation
The film survives in the Library of Congress collection but is incomplete.

References

External links

 
 

1925 films
1920s English-language films
Silent American comedy films
1925 comedy films
Paramount Pictures films
Films directed by James Cruze
American black-and-white films
American silent feature films
American films based on plays
1920s American films